Geminal halide hydrolysis is an organic reaction. The reactants are geminal dihalides with a water molecule or a hydroxide ion. The reaction yields ketones from secondary halides or aldehydes from primary halides.

Reaction mechanism
The first part of the reaction mechanism consists of an ordinary nucleophilic aliphatic substitution  to produce a gem-halohydrin:

 RCH(Cl)2 + KOH  RCH(OH)Cl + KCl

The remaining halide is a good leaving group and this enables the newly created hydroxy group to convert into a carbonyl group by expelling the halide:

RCH(OH)Cl   Rearrangement gives R-CHO + HCl

Variations
Other functional groups can undergo similar hydrolysis reactions. For instance, geminal trihalides (e.g. benzotrichloride) can be partially hydrolyzed to acyl halides (e.g. benzoyl chloride) in a similar way. Further hydrolysis yields carboxylic acids.

See also
Stephen aldehyde synthesis

References

Substitution reactions